Ondiri Wetland or Ondiri Swamp is a protected wetland and peatbog that is the source of the Nairobi River near Kikuyu, Kenya in Kiambu County. The wetland is under pressure because of water extraction, deforestation and accelerated erosion. Listed in 2021, the project's conservation is part of a larger initiative by the Kenyan government to reduce pollution to major waterways that provide water supply to Nairobi as part of the Thwake Dam project. The waterway is also important for local greenhouse agriculture. Ondiri Wetland covers 3,713,549 square feet and is a source to 40 springs, which provide water to the local community.

Ondiri was heavily polluted with pesticides and dumping. In 2004, a study found as few as 41 bird species. Around 2020, there were 76 species of birds living in Ondiri. In 2016, the Friends of Ondiri Wetland Kenya (FOWK) was established to rehabilitate and protect the bog; they run awareness campaigns, plant trees, and hold community events. .  "The biggest challenge I face is convincing people about the importance of the wetland. And in awareness creation, you convert polluters into consververs," says David Wakogi, co-creator of this FOWK in a documentary about his work.  Wakogi says there are now 76 species of birds in the wetland, compared to a 2004 assessment of 44 species.

Kenya's 2022 national celebration of World Wetland Day was held in Ondiri to highlight the importance of the country's largest highland bog. "More than 10,000 seedlings have been planted in the swamp through efforts of Kenya Forest Service (KFS) and NEMA. I am happy to report that the survival rate of the seedling is very impressive,” stated Cabinet Secretary for Environment and Forestry Mr Keriako Tobiko.

References 

Kiambu County